Chahar Rah-e Gashin (also Romanized as Chahār Rāh-e Gashīn) is a village in Kuh Mareh Khami Rural District, in the Central District of Basht County, Kohgiluyeh and Boyer-Ahmad Province, Iran. At the 2006 census, its population was 73, in 10 families.

References 

Populated places in Basht County